Llanllyfni is a village and a community in Gwynedd, Wales. It is in the historic county of Caernarfonshire. The community consists of the villages of Drws-y-coed, Nantlle, Nasareth, Nebo, Penygroes, Talysarn and the village of Llanllyfni itself. Penygroes, Llanllyfni and Talysarn are almost conjoined. As an electoral ward the 2011 census recorded a population of 1256. It is a largely Welsh-speaking village as 85% of the villagers speak Welsh as their first language. The community covers 43 square kilometres.

The river Afon Llyfni (sometimes spelt Afon Llyfnwy) runs through the village. Llanllyfni existed before the slate quarries opened but grew bigger and bigger during the slate quarrying period. In the 2001 census, there were about 650 people living in the village of Llanllyfni.

Llanllyfni is seven miles away from the well-known town of Caernarfon. Nearby is the Nantlle Ridge range of mountains including Craig Cwm Silyn at 734 metres (2,408 feet).

Amenities and buildings of note

Eglwys Sant Rhedyw (the parish church) has existed since as early as the 4th century.  Here, a service is held every year on Christmas Day at 7a.m., this is a tradition that has been ongoing for hundreds of years. In Welsh, the service is called 'Plygain'.  There are two other places of worship in the village:  Capel Ebeneser, Felingerrig - (Baptist Chapel) and Capel Moriah (Salem) - (Methodist Chapel). The original Capel Salem chapel was closed in the early 20th century, and replaced by a smaller chapel; named Capel Moriah chapel. The larger Capel Salem chapel was eventually demolished - except for the Sunday School building.  To avoid confusion, the new Capel Moriah was casually called Capel Salem by the villagers (after the old larger chapel). As of today, only Capel Ebeneser and Eglwys Sant Rhedyw are still open; Capel Moriah/Salem has closed.

There are five cemeteries in Llanllyfni:  Mynwent Eglwys Sant Rhedyw (the oldest), Mynwent Capel Ebeneser - Felingerrig, Mynwent Capel Salem, Mynwent Bara Caws (dating back to the early 18th century) and Mynwent Gorffwysfa (the newest).

Llanllyfni once had five public houses. At least two of them can be seen today though they have been turned into private dwellings. The King's Head was one of them. The last surviving pub, the Quarryman's Arms, closed due to a fire and has since been demolished. It was immortalised in the popular song "Quarry (Man's Arms)" by singer Bryn Fôn.

There is one school in the village, Ysgol Gynradd Llanllyfni, a primary school. For secondary school, children have to travel less than a mile to Ysgol Dyffryn Nantlle in Penygroes. World-famous Opera singer Bryn Terfel attended Ysgol Gynradd Llanllyfni.

A fair has been held in Llanllyfni on 6 July, St Rhedyw's Day, for at least 200 years and it is a tradition that still exists today.

The Neuadd Goffa (Memorial Hall) is the centre of village life with numerous events being held there throughout the year.

Llanllyfni is a proudly strong Welsh-speaking community. The Welsh language is central to village activities and events.

Sport and leisure
As of 2005, a local football club was set up, C.P.D. Llanllyfni (Clwb Pel Droed Llanllyfni). The club, popular among many villagers, sprung their way up from the Caernarfon & District League to the Gwynedd League.  It then went on to the very respectable Welsh Alliance League in no less than four seasons of playing football on the King George V playing field, situated in the middle of the village next door to the village's much used Memorial Hall.

Notable residents
Many culturally important and well known figures within the Welsh society have sprung from Llanllyfni. Some of the well-known people that have emerged from Llanllyfni include 20th-century writer Mathonwy Hughes (20th-century writer), singer and actor Bryn Fôn, Ysgol Glanaethwy founder Cefin Roberts, and writer and actor Wynford Ellis Owen.

Governance
An electoral ward in the same name exists. This ward does not include some of the larger communities named above and the total population taken at the 2011 Census was 1,256 only.

Notes

External links 

www.geograph.co.uk : photos of Llanllyfni and surrounding area

 
Villages in Wales
Villages in Gwynedd